The Inter-District Championship (IDC) is the amateur Fijian football cup. Only five teams (Suva, Rewa, Ba, Levuka and Lautoka) first took part in the first IDC held in Suva in 1938. From 1938 to 1975, the competition was initially held on a knock out format but in 1976 pool play was introduced.  From 1985, the competition was held in two divisions with the introduction of a second level tournament known as the Premier Division. In 1999 there was a short lived third level division. With Navua registering its first ever win of the IDC tournament in 2009, all the current (as of January 2010) Super Premium Division teams have now won the Lloyd Farebrother Trophy one or more time(s).

Nature of tournament 
The tournament is divided into two divisions. The Premier division (previously 10 teams) is currently made up of 8 district teams. At present these teams are Ba, Labasa, Lautoka, Nadi, Nadroga, Rewa, Suva, and Tailevu/Naitasiri. The teams are divided into two pools of four and each team plays all the other teams once, usually over four days. A win is worth 3 points, a draw 1 point and a loss 0 points. The top two teams in each pool qualify for the semi-finals, with the winner of each pool playing the runner-up of the other pool. The semi-finals and the final are played on the same day.

The First division is made up of 14 teams. At present these teams are Bua, Dreketi, Lami, Nadogo, Nalawa, Nasinu, Navua, Rakiraki, Seaqaqa, Savusavu, Tavua, Tailevu North, Taveuni and Vatukoula. The teams are divided into three pools of four and each team plays all the other teams once, over four days. A win is worth 3 points, a draw 1 point and a loss 0 points. The top team in each pool plus the best runner-up qualify for the semi-finals. The semi-finals and the final are played on the same day.

Inter-District Competition Roll of Champions

2018 Courts IDC

2019 Courts IDC 

IDC Premier Division Awards

 Golden Boot - Christopher Wasasala (Suva)
 Golden Ball - Antonio Tuivuna (Labasa)
 Fair Play Team - Suva
 New Find - Melvin Reddy (Labasa)

2020 Courts IDC

2020 Courts IDC - Premier Division 

IDC Premier Division Awards

 Golden Boot - Ilisoni Lolaivalu (Labasa)
 Golden Ball - Tevita Waranaivalu (Rewa)
 Golden Glove - Aquila Mateisuva (Labasa)
 Fair Play Team - Labasa

2020 Courts IDC - Second Division 

IDC Senior Division Awards

 Golden Boot - Taniela Raubula (Nadroga)
 Golden Ball - Paulo Buke (Nadroga)
 Golden Glove - Tevita Koroi (Tailevu Naitasiri)
 Fair Play Team - Bua

2022 Courts IDC

2022 Courts IDC - Super Premier Division 

IDC Super Premier Division Awards

 Golden Boot - Azariah Soromon (Suva)
 Golden Ball - Azariah Soromon (Suva)
 Golden Glove - Aquila Mateisuva (Suva)
 Fair Play Team - Suva

2022 Courts IDC - Premier Division

2022 Courts IDC - Senior Division

Summary of Winners and Runners-Up teams

Second Division Roll of Champions

See also 
 Fiji Football Association
 2019 Inter-District Championship
 2019 Inter-District Championship - Senior Division

References

External links 

 Fiji Live Football
 The Rec.Sport.Soccer Statistics Foundation.

Football leagues in Fiji
Soccer